The Butterpfad is a hiking trail in Rhineland-Palatinate, Germany.

History
The Butterpfad dates back to the time that farmers of the region transported their goods, mainly butter and milk, via this route to Neuwied, where they sold their goods at the market. The trail is marked with red-white waymarks and along the trail information tables are located, providing background information on the history of this activity.

Description

From its starting point at the St.-Kastor Chapel in Rengsdorf, the trail follows the Völkerwiesenbach valley through beech grove to the hut Philippsruhe at the Kreisstraße 105. Crossing this street, the trail passes Bonefeld in the direction of Strassenhaus. The trail crosses the K105, and goes along a replica of a charcoal production hill and through the sequoia forest, then crossing the B256 in Strassenhaus. The trail follows the direction , with a view on the pit frame of the abandoned , and leads through the Fockenbach valley in the direction  (Hümmerich mill). Passing the Alexander gallery and the quarry , after a final rise the trail reaches Hümmerich with its weighing scale museum.

References

Hiking trails in Rhineland-Palatinate